Is This Desire? is the fourth studio album by English musician PJ Harvey, released on 28 September 1998 on Island Records. It was re-released on vinyl LP in late January 2021.  A separate demo compilation of tracks from the album titled Is This Desire? - Demos was also released on vinyl LP and CD.

Background 
Recorded on and off in Somerset and London between April 1997 and April 1998, it was co-produced by Flood, Head and Harvey herself, and featured instrumental contributions from Rob Ellis, John Parish, Mick Harvey, Eric Drew Feldman, Joe Gore and Jeremy Hogg. It marked a move away from Harvey's earlier guitar-driven rock style into subtler, quieter, atmospheric soundscapes and mood pieces based around keyboards, bass and electronics.

Harvey spoke about the making of the album in an interview with Filter magazine in 2004, indicating it was the project of which, to date, she was proudest. "Again working with Flood, again trying to find new ground, but a particularly difficult time in my life. So, it was a very, very difficult, difficult record to make and still one I find very difficult to listen to, but probably my favorite record that I've made because it had a lot of guts. I mean, I was making extremely difficult music, experimenting with techniques I hadn't used before and not really caring what other people thought about it. I'm quite proud of that one." She also told The Telegraph, "I do think Is This Desire? is the best record I ever made—maybe ever will make—and I feel that that was probably the highlight of my career. I gave 100 per cent of myself to that record. Maybe that was detrimental to my health at the same time."

John Parish reflected on the album's recording in 2021: "[Is This Desire?] is probably the most compromised album that Polly's made, largely to do with the time over which it was made ... There were two long recordings sessions and almost a year's gap between them. The bulk of the first session took place in a small studio in Yeovil, so it was much more Heath Robinson setup, and the second session, most or all of it took place in a huge expensive London studio, so there were differences in the technical capabilities of the studio, but the same musicians basically in both sessions and same producers and engineers. It’s very difficult to sustain the identity of a record like that. It was also the only record where the record company came in and had a degree of creative input, which had never been sanctioned on any of the other records, certainly none of the other records I was involved with. The record company often never heard anything until they got the mastered album! ... on this album there were a couple of people who I felt took advantage of the fact Polly wasn't very well at that time. Normally she's so decisive and strong about what she feels, about what's going to happen, but on that record she wavered in the middle."

It is the first PJ Harvey album to feature lyrics printed on the inner sleeve.

The song "The Wind" was inspired by Saint Catherine, and in particular St Catherine's Chapel, Abbotsbury.
The lyrics discuss the chapel's location on top of a hill, and end with an inversion of a traditional prayer which women used at the chapel to pray for a husband. The village of Abbotsbury is near PJ Harvey's home.

Reception 

The album was met with critical acclaim. Q magazine praised the record as "disturbing and excellent", CMJ called it "another milestone in her already illustrious career", and Entertainment Weekly said it "seethes with hypnotic power"; the magazine Dazed & Confused claimed "Is This Desire? will be a classic of the next 10 if not 20 years. It has the impeccable timing of jazz, the arrangement of a classic dance track, the depth of an orchestral symphony and the emotional charge of gospel." It received a Grammy Award nomination as Best Alternative Music Performance of 1998. Although it did not sell as well as her 1995 commercial breakthrough To Bring You My Love, it did spawn her biggest UK hit with the single "A Perfect Day Elise"; a second single, "The Wind", charted on the UK Top 30.

Track listing

Personnel 
All personnel credits adapted from the album's liner notes.

Musicians
PJ Harvey – vocals, guitar
Mick Harvey – bass, keyboards
John Parish – guitar, keyboards
Rob Ellis – drums, percussion
Eric Drew Feldman – piano, keyboards

Additional musicians
Joe Gore – guitar
Jeremy Hogg – guitar
Terry Edwards – trumpet (10)
Richard Hunt – violin (11)

Technical
Flood – producer, engineer
PJ Harvey – producer
Head – producer
Marius De Vries – producer, engineer, mixing, programming (2, 3)
Andy Todd – engineer, mixing (2, 3)
Pete Davis – programming (2, 3)
Steve Sidelnyk – programming (2, 3)

Design
Maria Mochnacz – art direction, design, photography
Rob Crane – art direction, design
PJ Harvey – photography
Julia Hember – photography
Nick Daly – photography

Charts

Singles

Certifications and sales

References 

1998 albums
PJ Harvey albums
Albums produced by Flood (producer)
Albums produced by Marius de Vries
Island Records albums
Electronic rock albums by English artists
Trip hop albums by English artists